Sara Medina Hidalgo (born 8 August 1998) is a Spanish footballer who plays as a midfielder for Villarreal.

Club career
Medina started her career at Valencia B.

References

External links
Profile at La Liga

1998 births
Living people
Women's association football midfielders
Spanish women's footballers
People from Torrent, Valencia
Sportspeople from the Province of Valencia
Footballers from the Valencian Community
Valencia CF Femenino players
Villarreal CF (women) players
Primera División (women) players
Segunda Federación (women) players
Real Oviedo (women) players
Primera Federación (women) players